O Kadın is a 1982 Turkish romantic drama film, directed by Halit Refiğ and starring Gülsen Bubikoglu, Cihan Ünal, and Arsen Gürzap.

References

External links
O Kadın at the Internet Movie Database

1982 films
Turkish romantic drama films
1982 romantic drama films
Films directed by Halit Refiğ